Broughton Hall is a Gothic house at Yew Tree Lane West Derby, Liverpool, England, built in 1860 for Gustav Christian Schwabe, a Liverpool merchant originating from Hamburg. The conservatory added between 1870 and 1880 is of special interest.

The house was used as a preparatory school run by Roman Catholic nuns, but now Broughton Hall High School is an all-girls Roman Catholic comprehensive school with boys in the sixth form.

References

External links
 Broughton Hall High School Technology College
 Morton, B. (1995), "Supporting Columns: Restoring a Cast Iron Conservatory", Context 48 (December 1995), Institute of Historic Building Conservation, accessed 21 November 2007.
 Sisters of the Community of Our Lady of Mercy at Broughton Hall

Grade II* listed buildings in Liverpool
Grade II* listed houses
Country houses in Merseyside
Gothic Revival architecture in Merseyside